Brant Lake is a lake in South Dakota, in the United States.

Brant Lake was named for the frequent brant geese at the lake.

See also
List of lakes in South Dakota

References

Lakes of South Dakota
Lakes of Lake County, South Dakota